Sasai is a Japanese surname. Notable people with the surname include:

 Junichi Sasai (1918–1942), Japanese naval aviator and fighter ace
 Ryuji Sasai, Japanese video game composer and bass guitarist
 Surai Sasai, Japanese-born Buddhist bhikkhu (monk)
 Yoshiki Sasai, Japanese stem cell biologist

Japanese-language surnames